Sleeman may refer to:

Sleeman (surname)
Sleeman Breweries, a brewing company based in Guelph, Ontario
Sleeman, Ontario, a community in the Rainy River District of Northern Ontario

See also
 Sleeman Centre (disambiguation)